Yolanda del Prado Pascual Berrocal (born 15 September 1970), better known as Yola Berrocal, is a Spanish media personality who has worked as a dancer, singer and actress.

Biography
The daughter of mining engineer Manuel Pascual and decorator María del Rosario Berrocal, Yola Berrocal grew up in Pozuelo de Alarcón in Madrid, and studied Dramatic Art. Her first appearance on television was in 1994 on the show ¿Cómo lo veis? presented by Joaquín Prat, where she went with her family as a contestant. In 1997 she appeared as a dancer on the  program Risas y estrellas.

In 2003 she participated in the Telecinco reality show  and won. She is frequently featured in gossip magazines. She has undergone several breast augmentation operations.

In February 2006, Berrocal again appeared on the cover of Interviú, with the headline "I am going to put big tits in fashion in Spain." In the summer of that year she presented herself as a candidate for the mayorship of Marbella, creating the Yola Independiente Liberal (YIL) party, with the slogan "Marbella, because Yola is worth it." Santiago Segura hired her in 2007 to work as a contributor to his program  on LaSexta, where once a week she gave her personal opinion about books that she had previously read.

In 2012 she formed a new musical group, Atrevidas, with Sonia Monroy, whose best-known song was a cover of Sabrina's "Boys (Summertime Love)". Since then she has worked as an image girl in nightclubs and announced mobile games through her Twitter account.

She has worked as an assistant to Santiago Segura, contributing to several series and almost 60 television programs. On 11 April 2016, she was announced as a contestant of Supervivientes, where she reached 2nd place in the final.

In 2004, Antonio Ortega used her image for one of his unusual projects, which consisted of opening an office during an exhibition at the Fundació Joan Miró to obtain funds from companies in order to reproduce his wax figure.

Filmography

Films

Fiction TV series

Other TV series

Reality shows

Discography

With Sex Bomb
 Ven (2003 album)
 "Si llama, dile que he salido"
 "Armas de mujer"
 "Ven, ven, ven"
 "De mí te olvidaras"
 "Lloré tu ausencia"
 "Dance"
 "Cómeme"
 "Pegando fuerte"
 "If You Love Me"
 "Sin tu amor"

With Atrevidas
 "Boys (Summertime Love)"

Solo albums
 Hotel Glam
 Aquí hay tomate

References

External links
 
 

1970 births
20th-century Spanish actresses
21st-century Spanish actresses
20th-century Spanish dancers
20th-century Spanish singers
21st-century Spanish dancers
21st-century Spanish singers
Singers from Castilla–La Mancha
Living people
People from Ciudad Real
Reality show winners
Spanish female adult models
Spanish film actresses
Spanish television actresses
Survivor (franchise) contestants